Hostel Daze is an Indian Hindi-language comedy-drama streaming television miniseries created by Saurabh Khanna and written by Abhishek Yadav. Directed Raghav Subbu, it stars Adarsh Gourav, Luv, Shubham Gaur, Nikhil Vijay and Ahsaas Channa in lead roles. Hostel Daze premiered on Amazon Prime Video on 13 December 2019. The series contains three seasons, with a total of 15 episodes of approximately 30 minutes each. Season 2 premiered on 23rd July 2021 and season 3 premiered on 16th November 2022.

Premise
The series follows four hostel friends in their first year: Jhantoo (Nikhil Vijay), Chirag (Luv), and Jaat (Shubham Gaur) are new students in campus and become roommates.

Characters
The cast include:
 Nikhil Vijay as Jatin "Jhantoo"  who has been in college since very long time
 Shubham Gaur as  Rupesh Bhati "Jaat", who got admission in college by the large donation from his father
 Adarsh Gourav/Utsav Sarkar (Season 3) as Ankit Pandey, Akanksha's Boyfriend and "DOPA" of the college
 Luv as Chirag Bansal, a shy and over-eager kid, who prefers cleanliness in contrast to his roommates.
 Ahsaas Channa as Akanksha, Ankit's Girlfriend 
 Harsha Chemudu as Ravi Teja
 Ayushi Gupta as Nabomita Bharadwaj, Ankit's lab partner 
 Sahil Verma as Rakhi, Jhantoo's sidekick
 Ranjan Raj as Lolly (Season 1)
 Shivankit Singh Parihar as PhD student 4 (Season 1) and as Cricket Coach (Season 2)
 Sameer Saxena as Hostel Manager (Season 1)
 Nidhi Bisht as Teaching Assistant (Season 1)
 Sanat Sawant as Freshie (Season 1) 
 Chandan Roy as Dhobi (Season 2)

Reception
Jessica Xalxo, writing for RollingStone India observed: "Instead of confronting the very real issues that students are faced with, Hostel Daze trivializes them to the point of tradition, normalization and acceptance. And in its portrayal of the truth lies an endorsement that feels both endemic and dangerous, beyond the trappings of the genre."

Remake
Viral Fever remade the series in Tamil as Engga Hostel which is also available on Amazon Prime Video.

References 

Amazon Prime Video original programming
2010s comedy-drama television series
2019 Indian television series debuts
2010s Indian television miniseries
TVF Play Shows